Gina Suzanne Ogilvie is a Canadian global and public health physician. She is a Tier 1 Canada Research Chair in Global Control of HPV Related Diseases and Cancer, and Professor at the University of British Columbia in the School of Population and Public Health, Faculty of Medicine.

Early life and education
Ogilvie received her medical degree from McMaster University where she also completed a specialty in Family Medicine and a fellowship in Population Health and Primary care. She also received her Masters of Science (MSc)  at the University of British Columbia (UBC) and her Doctorate of Public Health from the University of North Carolina Gillings School of Global Public Health.

Career
Ogilvie has held positions at the BC Centre for Disease Control (BCCDC) as Associate Medical Director, Division of STD/AIDs, and later Medical Director of Clinical Prevention Services. She remains a Senior Public Health Scientist at the BCCDC. In 2015, Dr. Ogilvie became a Senior Research Advisor at B.C. Women's Hospital & Health Centre and the Associate Director of the Health Research Institute. She also received a Tier 1 Canada Research Chair in Global Control of HPV Related Diseases and Cancer at UBC's School of Population and Public Health. She has established the Global Control HPV Related Diseases Research Laboratory at the Women’s Health Research Institute, BC Women’s Hospital, and is the Principal Investigator for the QUEST HPV Study at the Vaccine Evaluation Center, and the landmark North American Cervical Cancer Screening Trial, the HPV FOCAL randomized control trial. In recognition of her work, she was the recipient of UNC's Michael S. O’Malley Alumni Award for Publication Excellence in Cancer Population Sciences in 2019.

The HPV FOCAL Study final results were published in 2018 in JAMA: “Effect of Screening with Primary Cervical HPV Testing vs Cytology Testing on High-grade Cervical Intraepithalial Neoplasia at 48 Months”. Results demonstrated that screening with primary HPV testing detected cervical pre-cancer earlier, and better than cytology-based screening.

Ogilvie and team received a $10 million grant from federal health minister Ginette Petitpas Taylor towards accelerating the elimination of cervical cancer (ACE Canada). She also received the 2018 YWCA Women of Distinction Award in the category of Research & the Sciences.

In 2020, Ogilvie received the University of British Columbia's Killam Research Prize in recognition of outstanding research and scholarly contributions. In 2021, Ogilvie and colleague Teresa Liu-Ambrose were elected to the Canadian Academy of Health Sciences.

Dr. Ogilvie also serves as an advisor for many national and international agencies and organizations, including the Canadian Partnership Against Cancer (cervical cancer screening working groups), with Black Physicians of BC, the World Health Organization amongst others.

References 

Living people
UNC Gillings School of Global Public Health alumni
McMaster University alumni
University of British Columbia alumni
Academic staff of the University of British Columbia
Canada Research Chairs
Year of birth missing (living people)
Fellows of the Canadian Academy of Health Sciences